The 2006 Stanley Cup playoffs for the National Hockey League (NHL) championship began on April 21, 2006, following the 2005–06 regular season. This was the first playoffs since 2004 due to the 2004–05 NHL lockout that cancelled the previously scheduled season. The 16 teams that qualified, seeded one through eight from each conference, played best-of-seven series with re-seeding after the Conference Quarterfinals. The conference champions played a best-of-seven series for the Stanley Cup.

The Finals concluded on June 19 with the Carolina Hurricanes winning the Stanley Cup, defeating the Edmonton Oilers in the final series four games to three. Carolina goaltender Cam Ward was awarded the Conn Smythe Trophy as Most Valuable Player of the playoffs.  The Edmonton Oilers would miss the playoffs each year thereafter until 2017. This was also the most recent time that the Pittsburgh Penguins missed the playoffs.

While the 2005–06 season introduced a shootout to break ties after five minutes of four-on-four overtime, the Stanley Cup playoffs retained their traditional format of unlimited 20-minute periods of five-on-five sudden-death overtime to break ties.

The Western Conference made history in the first round when all four series were won by the lower-seeded teams (conversely, all four series in the Eastern Conference were won by the higher-seeded teams). The eighth- and lowest-seeded Oilers proceeded to win the Western Conference and participate in the Stanley Cup Finals. Four Canadian teams qualified for the playoffs this year, this total was not equaled again until 2013 and not exceeded until 2015 with five.

Playoff seeds

Eastern Conference
Ottawa Senators, Northeast Division champions, Eastern Conference regular season champions – 113 points
Carolina Hurricanes, Southeast Division champions – 112 points
New Jersey Devils, Atlantic Division champions – 101 points (46 wins)
Buffalo Sabres – 110 points
Philadelphia Flyers – 101 points (45 wins)
New York Rangers – 100 points
Montreal Canadiens – 93 points
Tampa Bay Lightning – 92 points

Western Conference
Detroit Red Wings, Central Division champions, Western Conference regular season champions, Presidents' Trophy winners – 124 points
Dallas Stars, Pacific Division champions – 112 points
Calgary Flames, Northwest Division champions – 103 points
Nashville Predators – 106 points
San Jose Sharks – 99 points
Mighty Ducks of Anaheim – 98 points
Colorado Avalanche – 95 points (43 wins)
Edmonton Oilers – 95 points (41 wins)

Playoff bracket

Conference Quarterfinals

Eastern Conference Quarterfinals

(1) Ottawa Senators vs. (8) Tampa Bay Lightning

The Ottawa Senators entered the playoffs as the Eastern Conference regular season and Northeast Division champions with 113 points. Tampa Bay qualified as the eighth seed earning 92 points during the regular season. This was the first playoff meeting between these two teams. Ottawa won all four games during this year's regular season series.

The Senators defeated the Lightning in five games. The Senators used a two-man advantage in the third period of game one to gain the lead as they took the game by a score of 4–1. In game two the Lightning came back from a one-goal deficit by scoring two goals 55 seconds apart as they evened the series with a 4–3 victory. Six Ottawa skaters scored a goal in game three as the Senators won 8–4. Ottawa scored three times in the second-period of game four as they earned a 5–2 win. Martin Havlat scored the series-winning goal for the Senators at 15:02 of the second period as Ottawa closed out the series with a 3–2 victory.

(2) Carolina Hurricanes vs. (7) Montreal Canadiens

The Carolina Hurricanes entered the playoffs as the Southeast Division champions, earning the second seed in the Eastern Conference with 112 points. Montreal qualified as the seventh seed earning 93 points during the regular season. This was the seventh playoff meeting between these two teams with Montreal winning five of the six previous series. They last met in the 2002 Eastern Conference Semifinals where Carolina won in six games. Carolina won all four games during this year's regular season series.

The Hurricanes eliminated the Canadiens in six games. After allowing a goal in the opening minute of game one the Canadiens scored six unanswered goals taking the opening game of the series 6–1. Carolina pulled goaltender Martin Gerber after allowing three goals in the first period of game two and he was replaced by 22-year-old rookie backup Cam Ward. The Hurricanes were able to tie the game with 90 seconds remaining in regulation before losing in double overtime as Michael Ryder scored at 2:32, giving Montreal a 6–5 win. In game three Eric Staal scored the game winner 3:38 into overtime as Carolina won 2–1. Rod Brind'Amour gave the Hurricanes the lead in game four and they hung on to win 3–2. Cam Ward made 30 saves and allowed just one goal against as the Hurricanes took game five 2–1. Hurricanes forward Cory Stillman ended the series at 1:19 of the first overtime as Carolina won game six 2–1.

(3) New Jersey Devils vs. (6) New York Rangers

The New Jersey Devils entered the playoffs as the Atlantic Division champions (winning the tie-breaker with Philadelphia in total wins), earning the third seed in the Eastern Conference with 101 points. New York qualified for the first time since 1997 as the sixth seed earning 100 points during the regular season. This was the fourth playoff meeting between these two teams with New York winning all three previous series. They last met in the 1997 Eastern Conference Semifinals where New York won in five games. The teams split this year's eight game regular season series.

The Devils swept the Rangers in four games. The Devils scored five times on the power play in game one winning 6–1, Devils forward Patrik Elias scored six points in the victory (two goals and four assists). In game two John Madden scored a hat trick for the Devils as they earned a 4–1 victory. Martin Brodeur earned his 21st career playoff shutout with 25 saves as the Devils won game three 3–0. New Jersey took the lead in the second period of game four with two power play goals and they never looked back eliminating the Rangers by a final score of 4–2.

(4) Buffalo Sabres vs. (5) Philadelphia Flyers

The Buffalo Sabres entered the playoffs as the fourth seed in the Eastern Conference with 110 points. Philadelphia qualified as the fifth seed (losing the tie-breaker with New Jersey in total wins for the Atlantic Division title) earning 101 points during the regular season. This was the eighth playoff meeting between these two teams with Philadelphia winning five of the seven previous series. They last met in the 2001 Eastern Conference Quarterfinals where Buffalo won in six games. Buffalo won three of the four games during this year's regular season series.

The Sabres defeated the Flyers in six games. Philadelphia goaltender Robert Esche made 55 saves in a 3–2 Flyers loss; Daniel Briere ended the game with a goal at 7:31 in double-overtime. Buffalo forwards Jean-Pierre Dumont and Jason Pominville each recorded hat-tricks in game two as the Sabres scored three power play goals rolling to an 8–2 victory. Peter Forsberg scored two second period goals in game three to break a 1–1 tie, the Flyers went on to win the game 4–2. In game four R. J. Umberger put the Flyers up for good with his goal at 9:51 in the third period as Philadelphia evened the series with a 5–4 victory. Sabres goaltender Ryan Miller made 24 saves to earn his first career playoff shutout in game five as Buffalo won 3–0. In game six the Sabres jumped to a 5–0 lead on a goal by Maxim Afinogenov as the Flyers pulled Robert Esche from the game, Buffalo went on to a resounding 7–1 series-clinching victory.

Western Conference Quarterfinals

(1) Detroit Red Wings vs. (8) Edmonton Oilers

The Detroit Red Wings entered the playoffs as the Presidents' Trophy winners, the Western Conference regular season and Central Division champions, with 124 points. Edmonton qualified as the eighth seed earning 95 points (losing the tie-breaker with Colorado in total wins) during the regular season. This was the third playoff meeting between these two teams with Edmonton winning both previous series. They last met in the 1988 Clarence Campbell Conference Final where Edmonton won in five games. Detroit won this year's four game regular season series earning six of eight points during the season.

The eighth seeded Oilers upset the Red Wings in six games. Red Wings winger Kirk Maltby scored two goals in game one, including the winner in double overtime as Detroit won 3–2. The Oilers took the lead by scoring twice in 57 seconds in the second period of game two as they hung on to win 4–2. Jarret Stoll provided the game-winner in double overtime in game three giving the Oilers a 4–3 victory. The Red Wings scored three power-play goals in game four earning a 4–2 victory to tie the series. Oilers goaltender Dwayne Roloson made 30 saves as Edmonton hung on to win game five by a score of 3–2. The Oilers overcame a two-goal deficit after two periods of play in game six by scoring four times in third period, Ales Hemsky broke the tie with 1:06 remaining in regulation as Edmonton ended the series with a 4–3 win.

(2) Dallas Stars vs. (7) Colorado Avalanche

The Dallas Stars entered the playoffs as the Pacific Division champions, earning the second seed in the Western Conference with 112 points. Colorado qualified as the seventh seed earning 95 points (winning the tie-breaker with Edmonton in total wins) during the regular season. This was the fourth and 2nd most recent playoff meeting between these two teams, with Dallas winning two of three previous series. They last met in the 2004 Western Conference Quarterfinals where Colorado won in five games.

The Avalanche upset the Stars in five games. After trailing by two early in the first period of game one the Avalanche scored five un-answered goals and won by a score of 5–2. Brett Clark tied the game with a short-handed goal at 17:56 of the third period and four and a half minutes into overtime Joe Sakic scored his NHL-record seventh career playoff overtime goal to end the game in a 5–4 Colorado victory. Avalanche forward Andrew Brunette scored with 57 seconds remaining in the third period to tie game three and Alex Tanguay tallied his second goal of the game at 1:09 of the first overtime to give the Avalanche a 4–3 win. Dallas staved off elimination in game four as Niklas Hagman scored two goals in a 4–1 victory. Colorado goaltender Jose Theodore made 50 saves in game five and Andrew Brunette scored the series-clinching goal nearly fourteen minutes into overtime to give the Avalanche a 3–2 win.

(3) Calgary Flames vs. (6) Mighty Ducks of Anaheim

The Calgary Flames entered the playoffs as the Northwest Division champions, earning the third seed in the Western Conference with 103 points. Anaheim qualified as the sixth seed earning 98 points during the regular season. This was the first playoff meeting between these two teams. The teams split this year's four game regular season series.

The Mighty Ducks eliminated the Flames in seven games. Flames goaltender Miikka Kiprusoff made 33 saves and Darren McCarty scored 9:45 into the first overtime as Calgary won game one 2–1. In game two Anaheim took a three-goal lead and hung on for a 4–3 victory. The Flames scored three power-play goals as they earned a 5–2 win in game three. Sean O'Donnell scored the overtime winner shortly after a power play expired in game four as Anaheim evened the series with a 3–2 victory. Flames captain Jarome Iginla scored twice as the Calgary held off a late charge by the Mighty Ducks taking a 3–2 victory in game five. In game six, Mighty Ducks captain Scott Niedermayer scored a power-play goal with just over five minutes remaining in regulation time as Anaheim forced a seventh game with their 2–1 win. Anaheim goaltender Ilya Bryzgalov made 22 saves as the Mighty Ducks ended the Flames season with a shutout winning game seven 3–0.

(4) Nashville Predators vs. (5) San Jose Sharks

The Nashville Predators entered the playoffs as the fourth seed in the Western Conference with 106 points. San Jose qualified as the fifth seed earning 99 points during the regular season. This was the first playoff meeting between these two teams. Nashville won this year's four game regular season series earning six of eight points during the season.

The Sharks eliminated the Predators in five games. All four of the Predators goals in game one came on the power play as Nashville took the opening game 4–3. In game two San Jose scored three first period power play goals and Vesa Toskala earned a shutout in the Sharks 3–0 victory. San Jose captain Patrick Marleau scored twice in game three as the Sharks won 4–1. Nashville attempted to make a comeback late in game four as the Sharks hung on to win 5–4, Patrick Marleau recorded a hat trick in the victory. San Jose continued to exploit the Predators penalty killing in game five as they scored twice on the power play and ended Nashville's season with a 2–1 victory.

Conference Semifinals

Eastern Conference Semifinals

(1) Ottawa Senators vs. (4) Buffalo Sabres

This was the third playoff meeting between these two teams with Buffalo winning both previous series. They last met in the 1999 Eastern Conference Quarterfinals where Buffalo won in four games. Ottawa won five of the eight games during this year's regular season series.

The Sabres eliminated the Senators in five games. Sabres forward Tim Connolly tied game one with just 10.7 seconds left in regulation to tie the game at six and Chris Drury ended the game just 18 seconds into overtime as Buffalo won 7–6. Ryan Miller faced 44 shots and allowed just one goal against as the Sabres won game two 2–1. Overtime was required in game three after Jason Spezza tied the game late in the third period. Jean-Pierre Dumont ended the game with a goal at 5:05 of the first overtime as the Sabres took the game 3–2. In game four Wade Redden scored a power-play goal early in the third period as the Senators earned a 2–1 victory. Sabres rookie forward Jason Pominville became the first player in league history to score a short-handed overtime goal to end a series as he scored just 2:26 into the first overtime as Buffalo won game five 3–2.

(2) Carolina Hurricanes vs. (3) New Jersey Devils

This was the third playoff meeting between these two teams with the teams splitting the two previous series. They last met in the 2002 Eastern Conference Quarterfinals where Carolina won in six games. Carolina won this year's four game regular season series earning five of eight points during the season.

The Hurricanes defeated New Jersey in five games. Carolina scored five power-play goals in game one as they won 6–0. Scott Gomez gave the Devils a 2–1 lead with just over twenty seconds to go in the third period of game two, however just 18 seconds later Eric Staal scored the game-tying goal with just three seconds left in regulation time to send the game into overtime. Niclas Wallin tallied the game-winner 3:09 into the first overtime. In game three Carolina's Rod Brind'Amour scored the game-winner with 1:01 to play in the second period. New Jersey jumped out to a 5–0 lead and won game four with a final score of 5–1. Cory Stillman scored the series-winning goal at 14:20 of the second period as the Hurricanes held on for a 4–1 victory in game five.

Western Conference Semifinals

(5) San Jose Sharks vs. (8) Edmonton Oilers

This was the first playoff meeting between these two teams. Edmonton won three of the four games during this year's regular season series.

The Oilers came back from a two-game deficit to defeat the Sharks in six games. Patrick Marleau recorded a goal and an assist during game one in a 2–1 San Jose victory. The Sharks won game two 2–1 with Joe Thornton scoring the game-winner on the power play in the second period. Sharks goaltender Vesa Toskala made 55 saves in a losing effort in game three as the Oilers won in a triple-overtime on a goal scored by Shawn Horcoff at 2:24 to give Edmonton a 3–2 win. Edmonton came back from an early 3–1 deficit in game four and scored five unanswered goals to win 6–3 and to even the series at two games apiece. After San Jose tied game five early the third period the Oilers scored three unanswered goals as they took another 6–3 victory. Dwayne Roloson posted a 24 save shutout in game six as the Oilers took the game 2–0 with the game-winning goal from Michael Peca to win the series four games to two.

(6) Mighty Ducks of Anaheim vs. (7) Colorado Avalanche

This was the first playoff meeting between these two teams. Colorado won three of the four games during this year's regular season series.

Anaheim swept the Avalanche in four games. The Mighty Ducks scored four times in the second period of game one as Anaheim won 5–0, rookie Ilya Bryzgalov recorded his second-straight shutout. In game two Ilya Bryzgalov equalled a rookie record previously set by Frank McCool in 1945 as he recorded his third straight playoff shutout as the Mighty Ducks won 3–0. In game three Dan Hinote ended Ilya Bryzgalov's shutout streak at 249:15 (the second longest in league history) when he scored late in the first period for the Avalanche. Joffrey Lupul scored four goals including the overtime winner as the Mighty Ducks won 4–3. Joe Sakic scored the only goal for the Avalanche in game four as Anaheim finished off the series with a 4–1 victory to advance to their second Conference Final appearance in team history.

Conference Finals

Eastern Conference Final

(2) Carolina Hurricanes vs. (4) Buffalo Sabres

This was the first playoff meeting between these two teams. Carolina most recently made it to the Conference Finals in 2002, defeating Toronto in six games, while the Sabres last made it to the Conference Finals in 1999, defeating Toronto in five games. Carolina won three of the four games in this year's four game regular season series.

The Hurricanes eliminated the Sabres in seven games. Sabres goaltender Ryan Miller made 29 saves in game one as Buffalo won 3–2. Ray Whitney scored twice in the second period of game two as the Hurricanes evened the series with a 4–3 victory. The Sabres scored four times in just over thirteen minutes in game three as they earned a 4–3 win. Martin Gerber made 22 saves in a shutout victory for the Hurricanes as they took game four by a score of 4–0. Cam Ward replaced Martin Gerber early in the second period of game five as the Hurricanes came back from a two-goal deficit and won the game 4–3 on a power-play goal scored by Cory Stillman at 8:46 of the first overtime period. Daniel Briere forced a seventh game in this series with his game-winning goal at 4:22 of the first overtime as Buffalo won game six 2–1. Hurricanes forward Rod Brind'Amour capitalised on a delay of game penalty to Brian Campbell at 11:22 of the third period in game seven as Carolina advanced to the Stanley Cup Finals with a 4–2 victory.

Western Conference Final

(6) Mighty Ducks of Anaheim vs. (8) Edmonton Oilers

This was the first playoff meeting between these two teams. Anaheim most recently made it to the Conference Finals in 2003, sweeping the Minnesota Wild in four games, while the Oilers last made it to the Conference Finals in 1992, losing to Chicago in four games. Edmonton won all four games during this year's regular season series.

The Oilers eliminated Anaheim in five games. Ales Hemsky's power-play goal at 11:35 of the second period gave the Oilers the lead as they took game one 3–1. Oilers goaltender Dwayne Roloson made 33 saves won again by a score of 3–1. Fernando Pisani scored the game-winning goal for the Oilers in game three as the two teams traded eight goals in the third period and Edmonton hung on for a 5–4 victory. Anaheim changed goaltenders before the start of game four as Jean-Sebastien Giguere got the start for the Mighty Ducks. Anaheim took a three-goal lead in the first period and never looked back winning the game 6–3. Dwayne Roloson made 32 saves as the Oilers ended the series with a 2–1 victory in game five. The Oilers became the first eighth-seeded team to reach the Finals under this playoff format (which was introduced in 1994). Anaheim changed their team nickname, uniforms and logo after the season as they became known as the Anaheim Ducks.

Stanley Cup Finals

This was the first playoff meeting between these two teams. Carolina made their second Finals appearance, while Edmonton made their seventh appearance in the Finals. The Hurricanes were defeated in their last appearance in the Finals losing to Detroit in five games in 2002, the Oilers won their last appearance in the Finals defeating Boston in five games in 1990. The teams did not meet during the regular season. This series marked the first time that two former World Hockey Association teams played against each other for the Stanley Cup since they merged with the NHL in 1979. This was the first Stanley Cup Finals to be contested by two teams that had both missed the playoffs the previous season.

Player statistics

Skaters
GP = Games played; G = Goals; A = Assists; Pts = Points; +/– = Plus/minus; PIM = Penalty minutes

Goaltending
These are the top five goaltenders based on either goals against average or save percentage with at least four games played.

GP = Games played; W = Wins; L = Losses; SA = Shots against; GA = Goals against; GAA = Goals against average; TOI = Time On Ice (minutes:seconds); Sv% = Save percentage; SO = Shutouts

References

See also
2005–06 NHL season
List of NHL seasons

playoffs
Stanley Cup playoffs